The Politics of Xiangxi Tujia and Miao Autonomous Prefecture in Hunan province in the People's Republic of China is structured in a dual party-government system like all other governing institutions in mainland China.

The Mayor of Xiangxi Tujia and Miao Autonomous Prefecture is the highest-ranking official in the People's Government of Xiangxi Tujia and Miao Autonomous Prefecture or Xiangxi Tujia and Miao Autonomous Prefecture Municipal Government. However, in the prefecture's dual party-government governing system, the Mayor has less power than the Communist Party of Xiangxi Tujia and Miao Autonomous Prefecture Municipal Committee Secretary, colloquially termed the "CPC Party Chief of Xiangxi Tujia and Miao Autonomous Prefecture" or "Communist Party Secretary of Xiangxi Tujia and Miao Autonomous Prefecture".

History
During the 1950s, debate arose within government institutions of Hunan about what sort of designation to bestow upon present-day Xiangxi, resulting from a wider debate about Tujia identity. In the early portion of the decade, a number of ethnic Tujia in the region and beyond protested initial classifications which labelled them as part of the Miao people. This classification resulted in Xiangxi being designated as a Miao Autonomous Prefecture during this period. Provincial officials remained quite hesitant about officially recognizing the Tujia people as their own ethnic group, with one protesting during a meeting that "If the Tujia are an ethnic minority, all of China is [made up of] ethnic minorities, and I am an ethnic minority too". In February 1954, a team from the national government concluded that the Tujia were a distinct ethnic minority, which Hunan provincials again rejected. Hunan officials, opposed to create a Tujia Autonomous Prefecture due in part to the affirmative action policies which the region would receive, even claimed that the Tujia language was simply a local dialect. Finally, on January 3, 1957, the central government recognized the Tujia people as a distinct ethnicity.

This decision shifted the debate over whether the Tujia of Hunan should be awarded their own Autonomous Prefecture, or whether it would be shared with the local Miao people. Many Tujia in the region supported a distinctly Tujia Autonomous Prefecture, while officials in the Hunan provincial government largely favored a joint Tujia and Miao Autonomous Prefecture. During this time, the national Anti-Rightist Campaign began to intensify, resulting in a number of people in the area being listed as "rightists". Shortly before a provincial meeting regarding the status of the Autonomous Prefecture, a prominent activist for a solely Tujia Autonomous Prefecture was condemned for being a rightist, influencing the meeting participants to recommend a joint Tujia and Miao Autonomous Prefecture.

Following this recommendation, the Xiangxi Tujia and Miao Autonomous Prefecture was established in the summer in 1957. However, the Anti-Rightist Campaign began to intensify shortly after the Autonomous Prefecture's founding, and began to include ethnic issues among its "rightist" offenses. Throughout Hunan, over 300 people were labelled as "ethnic problems", and 41 Tujia people were labelled as "ethnic rightists". However, the Hunan provincial government's past unwillingness to classify and identify Tujia people prevented any wider targeting within the region. These problems regarding the Tujia people appear to be isolated to Hunan, with few instances of anti-Tujia targeting being reported among the Tujia population in neighboring Enshi Tujia and Miao Autonomous Prefecture, in Hubei province.

Following the death of Mao Zedong, and the end of the Cultural Revolution, the Eleventh Congress of the Chinese Communist Party reintroduced policies meant to empower and aid ethnic minorities. However, many in Hunan remained fearful of ethnic persecution, and the provincial government failed to restart these policies for multiple years. During the mid-1980s, government authorities within the Xiangxi Tujia and Miao Autonomous Prefecture began to survey the Autonomous Prefecture's population in order to identify ethnic minorities, often using self-reports to classify people.

One report from 1996 found that the one-child policy, which ethnic minorities were supposed to be exempt from, was loosely enforced among the Tujia people of the Autonomous Prefecture.

On August 14, 2009, Li Dalun was sentenced to life imprisonment for accepting bribes, holding a huge amount of property from an unidentified source and abusing his power by the Higher People's Court in Hunan.

On December 18, 2013, Tong Mingqian was placed under investigation by the Central Commission for Discipline Inspection of the Chinese Communist Party for "serious violations of laws and regulations".

List of mayors of Xiangxi Tujia and Miao Autonomous Prefecture

List of CPC Party secretaries of Xiangxi Tujia and Miao Autonomous Prefecture

References

Xiangxi Tujia and Miao Autonomous Prefecture
Xiangxi